A beylerbeylik in the Safavid Empire was a large administrative entity within during the 15th-18th centuries. They were governed by beylerbeys ("bey of beys" i.e., commander-in-chiefs) The term was originally used in the Ottoman Empire.

In the 17th century the Safavid state was divided into thirteen beylerbeydoms. Lands under the personal ownership of the shah or the reigning dynasty in the Safavid state were not part of beylerbeyliks.

Beylerbeys, usually titled khans, possessed administrative power and headed the local troops. In the beginning of the 17th century the Safavi shahs attempted to limit the beylerbeys' power, but failed to achieve this.

See also
 Beylerbeylik

References

Government of Safavid Iran